James I. McCord (born 1919 in Breadalbane, Ontario; died February 19, 1990) was a president of Princeton Theological Seminary. He also won the 1986 Templeton Prize.

150 Years of Princeton Theological Seminary
In 1962, as President of Princeton Theological Seminary, McCord hosted the Princeton Theological's 150-year anniversary festivities.

References

1919 births
1990 deaths
Princeton Theological Seminary faculty
Templeton Prize laureates
Presidents of Calvinist and Reformed seminaries